The World Is Too Big For One Lifetime is Die So Fluid's third full-length album. It was released in the United Kingdom on 7 June 2010, and in the United States that autumn. The album was released in Germany, Austria, Switzerland, the Netherlands, Belgium, Luxembourg, France, Norway, and Sweden on November 5.

The album was recorded at Assault and Battery and The Square (part of Miloco Studios), and Beethoven Street Studios, London in 2009.

Track listing
Music by Die So Fluid, Lyrics by Grog, except where stated

Personnel
Band
 Grog – vocals, bass
 Drew "Mr Drew" Richards – guitar
 Al Fletcher – drums
Additional Performers
 Bronwen Whitaker – violin on "Raven"
Production
 Mark Williams – producer
 Mathew Wiggins – assistant engineer
 Tom Loffman – assistant engineer
 Alan Douches – mastering
 Shelley Hannan – cover design
 Paul Harries – photography

Singles
"Mercury" was released as the first single. Its original release date of 10 May was rescheduled to 7 June to coincide with the album. A music video was also released.

"What A Heart Is For" was the second single. It was released exclusively to MySpace Germany on 27 October 2010. Although it could be viewed from anywhere via a link which the band provided, it was released internationally on November 6 through the band's YouTube and Facebook accounts.

References

External links
 
 
 Album Review by Clink Magazine, 1 June 2010
 Album Review by Terrorizer, 12 May 2010

2010 albums
Die So Fluid albums